The 1964 Canada Cup took place December 3–6 at the Kaanapali Golf Resort in Kaanapali, Hawaii, on the island of Maui. It was the 12th Canada Cup event, which became the World Cup in 1967. The tournament was a 72-hole stroke play team event with 34 teams. These were the same teams that had competed in 1963 but with the addition of Hawaii. Each team consisted of two players from a country. The combined score of each team determined the team results. The American team of Jack Nicklaus and Arnold Palmer won by 11 strokes over the Argentine team of Roberto De Vicenzo and Leopoldo Ruiz. The individual competition was won by Jack Nicklaus, who finished two shots ahead of Arnold Palmer.

Teams

Source

Scores
Team

International Trophy

Source

References

World Cup (men's golf)
Golf in Hawaii
Canada Cup
Canada Cup
Canada Cup